is a passenger railway station located in the city of Izumisano, Osaka Prefecture, Japan, operated by the private railway operator Nankai Electric Railway. It has the station number "NK29".

Lines

Layout
The station consists of two opposed side platforms connected by a level crossing.

Platforms

Adjacent stations

History
Iharanosato Station opened on 1 April 1952.

Passenger statistics
In fiscal 2019, the station was used by an average of 1542 passengers daily.

Surrounding area
 Osaka Prefectural Road No. 20
 Icora Mall Izumisano

See also
 List of railway stations in Japan

References

External links

  

Railway stations in Japan opened in 1952
Railway stations in Osaka Prefecture
Izumisano